Charles William "Shorty" Gallagher (April 30, 1872 – June 23, 1924) was a Major League Baseball player who played for one season. He played two games for the Cleveland Bluebirds during the 1901 Cleveland Bluebirds season.

External links

1872 births
1924 deaths
Major League Baseball outfielders
Cleveland Blues (1901) players
Baseball players from Michigan
Twin Cities Hustlers players
Twin Cities Twins players
Wheeling Nailers (baseball) players
Paterson Silk Weavers players
Peoria Blackbirds players
Rockford Forest Citys (minor league) players
Chatham Reds players
St. Joseph Saints players
Stratford Poets players
Wheeling Stogies players
New Orleans Pelicans (baseball) players
Port Huron Tunnelites players